Theodore McClain (born August 30, 1946) is a retired American professional basketball player.

A 6'1", 180 lb (82 kg) guard from Tennessee State University, McClain played eight seasons (1971–1979) of professional basketball in the ABA and NBA.

While in college McClain was named the Most Outstanding Player of the 1970 NCAA Men's Division II Basketball Tournament in a losing effort, as Tennessee State lost in the finals to Philadelphia University.

McClain was selected in the second round of the 1971 NBA draft by the Atlanta Hawks and in the same year's ABA Draft by the Carolina Cougars.   McClain opted to play for the Cougars.

McClain competed for the Carolina Cougars, Kentucky Colonels, New York Nets, Denver Nuggets, Buffalo Braves, Philadelphia 76ers, and Phoenix Suns. In his career, McClain averaged 8.4 points per game and 3.4 assists per game. He also appeared in the 1974 ABA All-Star Game.

McClain holds the ABA record for steals in a single game with 12, set against the New York Nets on December 26, 1973.

References

External links 

1946 births
Living people
African-American basketball players
American men's basketball players
Atlanta Hawks draft picks
Basketball players from Nashville, Tennessee
Buffalo Braves players
Carolina Cougars draft picks
Carolina Cougars players
Denver Nuggets players
Kentucky Colonels players
New York Nets players
Philadelphia 76ers players
Phoenix Suns players
Point guards
Shooting guards
Tennessee State Tigers basketball players
21st-century African-American people
20th-century African-American sportspeople